Firdous Ahmed Tak (born 1977) is an Indian lawyer, journalist, author, and politician from the Kishtwar district of Jammu and Kashmir and member of People's Democratic Party. He was elected as member of legislative council from 2015 to 2019. He remained president of Jammu and Kashmir Water Sports Association from 2015 to 2021. He also serves as J&K Waqf Board member from 2015 to 2019.

Career
Firdous Tak has worked as a journalist with Los Angeles Times and as of 2022, he is the resident editor of Greater Kashmir. He is also a columnist at Indian Express.

On 3 March 2015, Tak was elected as Member of Legislative Council during PDP-BJP alliance. He was also appointed as president for J&K Water Sports Association in the same year.

Further reading

References

1977 births
Living people
People from Kishtwar district
Jammu and Kashmir Peoples Democratic Party politicians
Indian people of Kashmiri descent
Kashmiri people